Châu Lê Phước Vĩnh (born 22 June 1985) is a Vietnamese footballer who plays as a centre-back for V.League 2 club Long An and the Vietnam national football team.

References 

1985 births
Living people
Vietnamese footballers
Association football central defenders
V.League 1 players
SHB Da Nang FC players
Long An FC players
People from Da Nang
Vietnam international footballers